Henry Ivory Emerson (March 15, 1871 – October 28, 1953) was a U.S. Representative from Ohio.

Born in Litchfield, Maine, Emerson moved with his parents to Lewiston, Maine, where he attended the public schools and studied law.
He moved to Cleveland, Ohio, in 1892 and was graduated from the Cincinnati Law School in 1893.
He was admitted to the bar the same year and commenced practice in Cleveland, Ohio.
He served as member of the Cleveland City Council in 1902 and 1903.

Emerson was elected as a Republican to the Sixty-fourth, Sixty-fifth, and Sixty-sixth Congresses (March 4, 1915 – March 3, 1921).
He was an unsuccessful candidate for renomination in 1920.
He resumed the practice of law.
He died in East Cleveland, Ohio, October 28, 1953.
He was interred in Lake View Cemetery, Cleveland, Ohio.

Emerson married Nettie Naumann at Cleveland, December 25, 1894. She died August 15, 1913, and Emerson remarried to Lillian McCormick, originally from Ontario, February 19, 1917. Emerson was a Methodist member.

References

Sources

1871 births
1953 deaths
Republican Party members of the United States House of Representatives from Ohio
Politicians from Cleveland
University of Cincinnati College of Law alumni
Burials at Lake View Cemetery, Cleveland
Cleveland City Council members
Ohio lawyers
People from Litchfield, Maine
Politicians from Lewiston, Maine